Petrokerasa, known before 1927 as Ravna (Ραβνά), is a village and a community of the Lagkadas municipality. Before the 2011 local government reform it was part of the municipality of Kallindoia, of which it was a municipal district. The 2011 census recorded 228 inhabitants in the village. The community of Petrokerasa covers an area of 27.398 km2.

See also
List of settlements in the Thessaloniki regional unit

References

Populated places in Thessaloniki (regional unit)